Wamba A Child of the Jungle is a 1913 silent short 2 reel film directed by Colin Campbell and released by the Selig Polyscope Company.

Cast
Tom Santschi as Portuguese Pete
Bessie Eyton as Wamba
Frank Clark as Dr. Rice
Eugenie Besserer as Mrs. Rice 
Baby Lillian Wade as Wamba's Child (*as Lillian Wade)

References

External links

1913 films
American silent short films
Lost American films
Films directed by Colin Campbell
Selig Polyscope Company films
American black-and-white films
1913 lost films
1913 short films
1910s American films